Tamara Rojo CBE (born 17 May 1974) is a Spanish ballet dancer. She is the English National Ballet's artistic director (2012–2022) and a lead principal dancer with the company. She was previously a principal dancer with The Royal Ballet. She will become the artistic director of San Francisco Ballet in late 2022.

Early life and training
Rojo was born in Montreal, Quebec, Canada, to Spanish parents who returned with her to Spain when she was 4 months old. At the age of 5 she began dance classes in Madrid and became a full-time student age 11 at Madrid's Royal Professional Conservatory of Dance, Mariemma studying with Víctor Ullate and Karemia Moreno.

Though her parents were pleased at her developing balletic talent, they insisted Rojo also complete an academic education through evening classes she could attend after studio rehearsals. Having graduated from the Conservatory at 16, she completed her secondary studies over the next two years. She went on to complete further degrees including a bachelor of dance, master of scenic arts and a PhD in performing arts, becoming DA magna cum laude in 2016 from King Juan Carlos University.

Career
Rojo began her professional career in 1991 with the Ballet de la Comunidad de Madrid, under the direction of Víctor Ullate. In 1994, she was awarded a gold medal at the Paris International Dance competition, together with a Special Jury Award from a panel including Natalia Makarova, Galina Samsova and Vladimir Vasiliev, three outstanding figures in the ballet world at that time.

Early career in Britain
In 1996 Galina Samsova, artistic director of Scottish Ballet, invited Rojo to join the company. There she performed principal roles in Swan Lake, The Nutcracker, La Sylphide and Cranko's Romeo and Juliet. Derek Deane, then English National Ballet artistic director, asked her to join ENB the following year. For her he created the roles of Juliet in "Romeo and Juliet" and Clara in "The Nutcracker" for which The Times named Rojo "Dance Revelation of the Year" in 1997. She also danced principal roles in Swan Lake, Paquita, Coppelia and Glen Tetley's The Sphinx.

Royal Ballet
Rojo approached Royal Ballet director Anthony Dowell in 2000 with a view to joining the company, and was invited to become a principal dancer when a contract became available later in the year. Over the next 12 years, she performed major roles in most of the company's repertoire including ballets choreographed by Kenneth MacMillan and Frederick Ashton, Dowell's Swan Lake, Makarova's La Bayadere, Rudolph Nureyev's Don Quixote, and Peter Wright 's The Nutcracker. She danced in the world premiere of Snow White, created for her by choreographer Ricardo Cué. The title role in Isadora was recreated for her by MacMillan's widow, the artist and set designer Deborah MacMillan, custodian of the late choreographer's ballets.

Major injuries
In 2000, Rojo was asked at short notice to replace the injured Royal Ballet principal Darcey Bussell in the title role in Giselle. Ignoring her own sprained ankle, Rojo learned the role in a fortnight and went on to receive rave reviews. In 2002, while dancing Clara in Nutcracker, Rojo began to tremble on stage. Sent to a private hospital after the performance, she learned her appendix had burst and was told to take six weeks off. However, she resumed dancing after only two, relapsed and returned to hospital. Rojo admitted some years later it was "completely wrong [to continue dancing while injured or ill] and I do not feel that anyone should do this. It really is not worth it."

In 2003, while preparing for the Royal Ballet's Australian tour, Rojo suffered an infected bunion so serious that her foot swelled to the size of a tennis ball. Doctors recommended surgery on her foot, a potentially career-ending operation. Months later, after countless hours of rehabilitation, she resumed dancing and said the injury changed her perspective on life, her body and dance. She felt that she valued each and every day more and learned that nothing in life should be taken for granted.

After this experience, she and her father developed a device to stretch pointe shoes in order to reduce pressure on bunions, and formed a company in 2017 to market it.

English National Ballet

In 2012, Rojo became the artistic director of English National Ballet, replacing Wayne Eagling.

Under her direction, the English National Ballet, for the first time in history, was invited to dance at the Paris Opera Palais Garnier. Appearing from 21 to 25 June 2016, ENB performed one of the most famous ballets in its repertoire: the Petipa and Sergeyev version of Le Corsaire in a revival by Anna-Marie Holmes.

In 2014, she presented a documentary entitled Good Swan, Bad Swan: Dancing Swan Lake for the BBC. She followed up with Giselle: Belle of the Ballet in 2017, which included the history of both the original production and the new ballet created for the ENB by Akram Khan. She had commissioned Khan to re-imagine the story: Khan won the Critics' Circle National Dance Awards 2017 for Best Classical Choreography, Alina Cojocaru won Outstanding Female Performance (Classical) as Giselle, and the company as a whole won an Olivier Award for Outstanding Achievement in Dance.

Rojo made her choreographic debut with a Florence Nightingale-inspired version of Raymonda, set during the Crimean War. It premiered in January 2022 at the London Coliseum.

San Francisco Ballet
In January 2022, it was announced that Rojo will become the artistic director of San Francisco Ballet at the end of the year, succeeding Helgi Tómasson. She will be the first woman to serve as artistic director of the company.

Repertoire
The following is a list of repertoire of Rojo's performance in various ballet companies.

Awards
 Honoured by the South Bank Sky Arts Outstanding Achievement Award 2022, for her ten transformational years as artistic director of the English National Ballet. 
 Gold Medal of the Academy of Performing Arts of Spain 2021.
 2016 Commander of the Order of the British Empire (CBE) for services to ballet.
 2013 Spanish-British Relationships of II Fundación Banco Santander Prize.
 2012 The Gold Medal for Fine Arts 2012 of the John F. Kennedy Center for Performing Arts.
 2011 Encomienda de número de Isabel la Católica.
 2010 Laurence Olivier "Best New Dance Production" award for her collaboration with choreographer Kim Brandstrup in "Goldberg: The Brandstrup-Rojo Project."
 2008 Prix Benois de la Danse
 2008 Comunidad de Madrid's International Medal of the Arts
 2007 City of Madrid's Interpretation Award
 2005 Premio Principe de Asturias a las Artes
 2004 Premio Positano "Leonid Massine"
 2002 Medalla de Oro al Mérito en las Bellas Artes – Consejo de Ministros del Reino de España.
 2002 Gold Medal of Fine Arts from King Juan Carlos
 2002 London's Critic's Circle Dance Awards
 2001 Sherringtons Awards Best Female Dancer of the Year
 2000 Barclays Theatre Awards: Outstanding Achievement in Dance
 1996 First prize of Italian Critics as Best Dancer of the Year
 1994 Grand Prix Femme et Medaille Vermeille de la Ville de Paris (à l'unanimité) – Concours International de Danse de Paris

Personal life
Rojo lives in Bloomsbury, London. Her husband is ballet dancer Isaac Hernández. The couple have a son, born in 2021.

References

External links

 
 Artistic Director of English National Ballet
 Royal Ballet Biography, Royal Opera House, London
 IMDB Profile
 Ballet interview, May 1998
 Cupcakes & Conversation with Tamara Rojo. Ballet News. 31 July 2009.
 The Woman Who Has Transformed English National Ballet New York Times interview 18 November 2016.

1974 births
Living people
Spanish ballerinas
People from Montreal
Prima ballerinas
Dancers of the Scottish Ballet
Principal dancers of The Royal Ballet
English National Ballet principal dancers
English National Ballet
National Dance Award winners
Prix Benois de la Danse winners
Canadian people of Spanish descent
Spanish expatriates in the United Kingdom
Commanders of the Order of the British Empire
21st-century ballet dancers
21st-century Spanish dancers